The 1941 NCAA Wrestling Championships were the 14th NCAA Wrestling Championships to be held. Lehigh in Bethlehem, Pennsylvania hosted the tournament at Taylor Gymnasium.

Oklahoma A&M took home the team championship with 37 points and having four individual champions.

Al Whitehurst of Oklahoma A&M was named the Outstanding Wrestler.

Team results

Individual finals

References

NCAA Division I Wrestling Championship
Wrestling competitions in the United States
1941 in American sports
1941 in sports in Pennsylvania